Marco Capone (born 22 January 1959) is an Italian ice hockey player. He competed in the men's tournament at the 1984 Winter Olympics.

References

External links
 

1959 births
Living people
Olympic ice hockey players of Italy
Ice hockey players at the 1984 Winter Olympics
People from Mals
Sportspeople from Südtirol